The Educators Rising (formerly Future Educators Association or FEA), a division of Phi Delta Kappa International (PDK), is a professional organization that supports students who are interested in education-related careers. Through affiliation with local chapters that are registered with the international office, prospective educators have access to scholarship opportunities, as well as age appropriate materials and activities, including a national conference, that help them gain a realistic understanding of the role of the teacher. As the only national pre-collegiate program for prospective teachers, Educators Rising helps students develop the strong leadership traits that are found in high-quality educators.

The Educators Rising international headquarters are located in Arlington, VA, United States.

Membership 

Currently, Educators Rising's network includes active chapters in 46 states and Department of Defense schools in Germany, Italy, Guam, Japan, and Puerto Rico. 

Educators Rising also has a network of statewide programs. Many of these state-level programs stage student conferences and professional development opportunities for Educators Rising advisors in addition to what the international program offers. Members are eligible to compete in regional, state, and national competitions and are eligible, should they meet its criteria, for the Educators Rising National Honor Society.

Mission 

The mission of Educators Rising is to foster the recruitment and development of prospective educators worldwide through the dissemination of innovative programming and relevant research.

Vision 

By elevating the image of teaching, Educators Rising will attract dynamic and diverse students who will become tomorrow's great educators.

History and governance 

During the first half of the last century, the National Education Association initiated a Future Teachers of America program. Similar efforts were also made by various state departments of education, many local schools, and, most notably, by Jan Towslee. As president of the Association of Teacher Educators, Towslee made the development of the Future Educators of America a priority. In 1994, Phi Delta Kappa International took the lead on FEA and provided it with an international headquarters. In 2005, PDK changed the name to Future Educators Association to more accurately reflect the international nature of the organization. In 2015, FEA changed its name to Educators Rising, defined as one of seven divisions of PDK International. In this incarnation it set pre-service standards, built curriculum, and created tools to advance the education profession at an earlier age. Currently, Educators Rising is governed by the PDK International Board, which is composed of thirteen individuals elected by PDK's professional membership.

External links 
 https://www.educatorsrising.org/
 https://www.futureeducators.org/about/history.htm

Career and technical student organizations